Baniwa (also known with local variants as Baniva, Baniua, Curipaco, Vaniva, Walimanai, Wakuenai) are indigenous South Americans, who speak the Baniwa language belonging to the Maipurean (Arawak) language family. They live in the Amazon Region, in the border area of Brazil, Colombia and Venezuela and along the Rio Negro and its tributaries.

There are an estimated 7,145 Baniwa in Brazil, 7,000 in Colombia and 3,501 in Venezuela's Amazonas State, according to Brazil's Instituto Socioambiental, but accurate figures are almost impossible to come by given the nature of the rainforest.

The Baniwa people rely mainly on manioc cultivation and fishing for subsistence. They are also known for the fine basketry that they skillfully produce.

See also
 Baniwa language, Curripako language
 Indigenous peoples in Brazil
 Indigenous peoples in Colombia
 Indigenous peoples in Venezuela

Notes

Further reading
Robin Wright 1998 - Cosmos, Self and History in Baniwa Religion: For Those Unborn
Theodor Koch-Grunberg 1909 -  Zwei Jahre unter den Indianern: reisen in nordwest-brasilien 1903-1905("Two years among the Indians")

Indigenous peoples of the Amazon
Indigenous peoples of the Guianas
Indigenous peoples in Venezuela
Indigenous peoples in Colombia
Indigenous peoples in Brazil